Anthony John Card (born 13 September 1929) is a former English first-class cricketer.

Born at Doncaster, Card played second XI cricket for Yorkshire, Middlesex and Leicestershire from 1953–1959, but was unable to establish himself. He did make two appearances in first-class cricket for the Marylebone Cricket Club, playing against Gloucestershire at Lord's in 1955, with a further appearance at Lord's in 1958 against Cambridge University. He scored a total of 51 runs in these matches, as well as taking seven wickets with his slow left-arm orthodox.

References

External links

1929 births
Living people
Cricketers from Doncaster
English cricketers
Marylebone Cricket Club cricketers
English cricketers of 1946 to 1968